Siah Mansur or Siyah Mansur or Seyah Mansur may refer to:
Siah Mansur-e Olya, Bushehr Province
Siah Mansur-e Sofla, Bushehr Province
Seyah Mansur, East Azerbaijan
Siah Mansur, Khuzestan
Siyah Mansur Rural District, in Kurdistan Province